Lisnahederna is a townland located in County Cavan, Ireland. The name means the fort of the ambush.  It is located in the parish of Mullagh, the barony of Castlerahan.

References

Townlands of County Cavan